John Anderson, FRS may refer to any of three scientists who were Fellows of the Royal Society: 
John H. D. Anderson (1726–1796), Scottish natural philosopher and educator, founder of Strathclyde University
Sir John Anderson (zoologist) (1833–1900), Scottish, first curator of the Indian Museum in Calcutta
John Stuart Anderson (1908–1990), British inorganic chemist who also worked in Australia

Note
John Anderson, 1st Viscount Waverley (1882–1958), British civil servant and politician, was an honorary Fellow of the Royal Society but did not use 'FRS' after his name

See also
John Anderson (disambiguation)